Ravni Topolovac is a village in Serbia. It is situated in the Žitište municipality, Central Banat District, Vojvodina province. The village has a Serb ethnic majority (88.09%) and its population numbering 1,352 people (2002 census).

Historical names
Some sources say that the first mention of the village called Topolovac dating from the seventeenth century. As stated, it was a settlement with predominantly Serbian population. In the area around Bečkerek, Lugosi and Timișoara there were more settlements under this name. For Hungary maps relating to the sixteenth, seventeenth and eighteenth century we find several villages under this name. Thus, the name transferred to more moves in the Banat villages along the river Tamis (Secanj, Šarca, Catherine). After World War II, the new settlers were given by Catherine the name of the settlement flat Topolovac.

The village belongs to the area now called the Middle Banat (I swear district, Torontalska County, Bečkerečki district, Tamiš Banat, Timișoara Banat, Tamiš district, Central district) in north latitude 45° 26 'and east longitude 20° 35'. Altitude resorts and Atari flat Topolovac range of 79 to 
1794–853  Katarinafeld (Каthаrinafeld)
1854–1864 Katarinenfeld(Katharinenfeld)
1864–1878 Katarinfeld (Каtharinfeld)
1878–1918 Katalinfalva (Katarinfalva)
1918–1920 Katarina
1920–1922 Katarinovac
1922–1941 Katarina
1941–1944 Kathreinfeld
1944–1947 Katarina (bilo je predloženo Tolbuhinovo)
1947–1948 Topolovac
1948–1949 Banatski Topolovac
1949–     Ravni Topolovac

Historical population

1948: 	2454 	
1953:	2086 	
1961: 	2096 	
1971: 	1817 	
1981: 	1656 	
1991: 	1445 	1407
2002: 	1483 	1352

See also
List of places in Serbia
List of cities, towns and villages in Vojvodina

References
Slobodan Ćurčić, Broj stanovnika Vojvodine, Novi Sad, 1996.
Borisa Radovanovic,Ravni Topolovac, monografija naselja, SANU, Beograd 1991.

Populated places in Serbian Banat